The Wienerfelder Messe (Vienna Pop-Mass) is a popmass written by Thomas Raber. The name comes from Raber's home-parish "Wienerfeld" in Vienna, where the debut performance took place in 2006. In that year Raber toured through the churches of Austria. Furthermore the Mass was presented in all notable churchly radiostations(Vatican Radio, Radio Stefansdom, Radio Maria,...).

Content 
 Opening: Lass uns feiern
 Kyrie: Stück für Stück
 Gloria: Wir loben dich und danken dir
 Intermediate Song: Hörst du?
 preparation of the Gifts: Der Leib Christi ist das Brot
 Sanktus: Heilig
 Offeratory: Gott ist da
 Thank-Song: Danke
 End: Wir sind Kinder Gottes

References 
 Italiancharts
 SR-Archiv

External links 
 Wienerfelder Messe

2006 albums
Masses (music)